The Kaweah Colony was a utopian socialist community in central California founded in 1886, with a name meaning "here we rest."  Located in the Sierra Nevada range, they lived near groves of giant sequoia trees.  The colony officially disbanded in 1892.  The establishment of Sequoia National Park in 1890 contributed to the colony's demise.  Some of their descendants still reside in the area.

History

Establishment

Inspired by the writings of Laurence Gronlund, colony leaders attempted to apply the ideals of scientific socialism.  The writings of United States socialist Edward Bellamy also influenced the project.  March 9, 1888, the colony was legally established through the Deed of Settlement and Bylaws of Kaweah Colony.  This colony based its economy on logging.  Membership cost $500 with $100 payable upon application and the remainder in installments of cash or labor.  Estimated nationwide membership peaked at 300-500 individuals, many of whom were non-resident supporters.  The resident population at its height was around 150. The colony published the local area's first newspaper, the Kaweah Commonwealth.

Kaweah Colony was noteworthy for its exploration of giant sequoia groves.  The tree now known as the General Sherman tree was originally named the Karl Marx tree by the colonists. The only remaining structure from the group's tenure at Sequoia is the Squatter's Cabin, now listed on the National Register of Historic Places.

Demise and legacy

The colony ran into legal problems when they attempted to continue operations after the creation of the national park, which was California's first national park and only the third in the United States.  A U.S. District Court in Los Angeles court convicted them of illegal logging on April 16, 1891.  In January 1892, the Kaweah Cooperative Colony company was dissolved.  For more than four decades some colonists attempted to gain government compensation for the loss of their logging claims, but were not successful.

Kaweah lives on in name at Twin Oaks Community, a contemporary intentional community of 100 members in Virginia. All Twin Oaks' buildings are named after communities that no longer exist, and "Kaweah" is the name of the largest and most eco-featured residence.

Footnotes

Further reading

 Robert V. Hine, California's Utopian Colonies. San Marino, CA: Huntington Library, 1953; pp. 78-100.
 Stacy C. Kozakavich, The Center of Civilization: Archaeology and History of the Kaweah Co-operative Commonwealth. PhD dissertation, UC Berkeley, 2007, AAT 3279627.
 J.J. Martin, "A Cooperative Commonwealth: The Kaweah Colony," The Nationalist [Boston], vol. 1, no. 6 (Oct. 1889), pp. 204-208.
 Carey McWilliams, Factories in the Field. New York: Little, Brown and Co., 1939.
 Jay O'Connell, Co-Operative Dreams: A History of The Kaweah Colony. Los Angeles: Raven River Press, 1999.

External links 

Kaweah Commonwealth Online
United States Park Service publication about Kaweah Colony
Norton, Marc. "The Karl Marx Tree: How Southern Pacific Railroad killed a socialist colony in the name of creating Yosemite National Park," 48 Hills, August 27, 2014.

See also
Burnette Haskell
C.C. Curtis

1886 establishments in California
1892 disestablishments in California
Bellamyism
Utopian socialism
Utopian communities in California
Former populated places in California
Populated places established in 1886
Populated places disestablished in 1892
History of Tulare County, California